Bishop Charles Lavigne, S.J. was a Roman Catholic Latin Rite bishop from France who was appointed as the first Vicar Apostolic in the Syro-Malabar Catholic Vicariate of Kottayam on 20 May 1887. After shifting the seat of Kottayam Vicariate to Changanacherry on 16 September 1890, his term ended on 28 July 1896. He later served as the first Bishop of Trincomalee, Sri Lanka from 27 August 1898 until his death at Marvejols in France on 11 July 1913.

Early life 
Louis Charles Lavigne was born in the Lavigne family on 6 January 1840 at Marvejols in France. His father was a farmer and an employee in a weaving mill. Charles' mother Louie Gordon was a convert from Protestantism. Charles was the youngest of the 12 children in the family. After his primary education at the school of Christian Brothers and higher education at a Jesuit college at the City of Mend in France, he joined seminary for priestly formation. Though his intention was to become a Jesuit priest, he first became a diocesan priest respecting the wishes of his parents.

Charles' priestly ordination was on 17 December 1864 at Mend by the imposition of hands by Msgr. Flockier. Charles was professor at Mend Diocesan Minor Seminary at the time of his ordination and he continued that for two more years. He joined the novitiate house of the Society of Jesus at Toulouse in France and did his religious profession on 27 December 1866. Then he served as prefect of the seminarians and teacher and prefect of studies in the minor seminary at Monbana in France for five years. Afterwards, he taught Mathematics and Physics at Kausia College.

Since Jesuits were expelled from France in 1880, he moved to Spain and worked as Science Professor at Uclés College. He was then transferred to Rome as assistant to Fr. Buck S.J., the general secretary of the Society of Jesus. After the death of Fr. Buck, Fr. Charles returned from Rome to France.

Vicar Apostolic of Kottayam 
The Syrian Catholics, who were part of the Vicariate of Verapoly along with the Latin Catholics, had been writing to Vatican seeking the establishment of Syrian dioceses and appointment of eparchs from their own rite and community. Though Bishop Mercellinus OCD, the co-adjutor bishop of Verapoly, was in charge of the Syrians, majority of them believed that their development would happen only under the leadership of their own bishops.

Considering the wishes of the Syrian faithful in Kerala, Pope Leo XIII separated the Syrians from the Archdiocese of Verapoly and established the Syrian Vicariates of Kottayam and Trichur. Msgr. Adolphus Edwin Medlycott was appointed as the Vicar Apostolic of Trichur and Charles Lavigne, the Vicar Apostolic of Kottayam and Titular Bishop of Milevum on 20 May 1887. Their role was to pave the way for transition from the governance of  foreign hierarchs to local bishops as head of the Syrian Catholics.

Reception and setup 
Within a few months after Charles returned from Rome to France, he was appointed as Vicar Apostolic of Kottayam, in Kerala state, India on 23 August 1887. His episcopal ordination as Titular Bishop of Milevum was on 13 November 1887 by Cardinal Borse. He started his journey to Kerala on 15 March 1888. He reached Trichy on 5 April 1888. At the request of Apostolic Delegate Msgr. Andrew Aiuti, Fr. Mani Nidhiri, Fr. Louis Pazheparambil, and Fr. Alexander T. OCD went to receive the bishop at Trichy. They, along with the bishop, went to Ootty to meet the Apostolic Delegate. Then they proceeded to Ernakulam which was also part of Kottayam Vicariate. After the reception at Ernakulam on 1 May 1888, Bishop Charles travelled to Mannanam via Vaikam by waterway. The reception at Mannanam on 9 May 1888 was a grant one. Bishop Lavinge took charge reading his Papal bull at St. George Church Edacat on 10 May 1888. That church became the first Cathedral of Vicariate of Kottayam.

Honoring the instruction from Rome, Bishop Charles appointed four Syrian priests as his consultors. Fr. Mani Nidhirikkal, Fr. Alexander Kattakkayath, Fr. Louis Pazheparambil were the consultors from the Northists and Fr. Joseph Tharayil was from the Southists. Bishop first lived at Mannanam Carmelite House and later moved to Kottayam town. According to the letter from the Apostolic Delegate on 6 May 1889 from Ootty, Bishop Charles appointed Fr. Mani Nidhiriakkal as Vicar General in charge of the Northists and Fr. Mathew Makil as Vicar General for Southists on 8 September 1889. These Vicar Generals from the local priests had some privileges including dressing like a bishop,  right to offer Pontifical Mass, administer the Sacrament of Confirmation, and giving minor orders for seminarians.

Though Bishop Charles made attempts to construct his residence and an educational institution in Kottayam town, he could not do them because of the ongoing disagreements with non-Catholics during that time. So, with the permission from ecclesiastical authorities, he moved his seat to Changanacherry that had a bigger church than Edacat and had a higher Catholic population. While maintaining the name, Vicariate of Kottayam, he moved to Changanacherry after two years on 16 September1890.

Contributions in Kerala 
Considering the ardent desire of the Syrian Christians, Bishop Charles worked hard for the development of his vicariate. He trained the clergy for their future pastoral leadership. He appointed vicar generals from Northists and Southists of his diocese and administered the vicariate through them. Instead of the traditional system of training candidates for priesthood by individual priests, Bishop Charles sent seminarians from his vicariate to seminaries in Verapoly, Mangalapuram, Papal Seminary in Kandy, and Propaganda Seminary in Rome.

Bishop Charles Lavinge held a Synod at the Church in Changanacherry from 18–20 December 1888 to discuss and decide on the details of pastoral arrangements in his vicarate. Vicars of parishes, superiors of religious congregations, and rectors of seminaries attended in the Changanacherry synod that made several pastoral decisions.

Bishop Charles established new churches. He elevated eight parishes of the Northists and two parishes of Southists as foranes on 10 October 1891. He codified regulations for church administration, introduced catechism classes in parishes and schools, and showed his interest in administering first Holy Communion to children. He promoted the use of scapular and devotion to the souls in purgatory. He gave importance to evangelization among the low casts and established churches for the new converts. He, along with Fr. Mani Nidhirikkal, promoted reunion of Jacobites to Catholic faith.

There were schisms against Catholic faith in the community. Bishop Charles tried to convince their leaders and followers to keep up the Catholic doctrines. He could win some of them.

Bishop Charles was the pioneer in establishing English educational institutions for the Syrians. The first school he established was St. Berchmans English High School in Changanacherry. He also started schools in other places including Brahmamangalam for the Southists, and supported school at Mannanam established by Carmelite priests. He established Girls Schools at Mutholy, Changanacherry, and Alappuzha. Along with convents, Bishop Charles started Job training centers for women.

Bishop Charles started or approved the establishment of religious congregations for men and women in the vicariate. He approved the desire of eight pious women from Pala and neighboring places, who were members of the Secular Franciscan (Third) Order to start a religious community. Thus, the Franciscan Clarist Congregation (FCC) was started at Changanacherry. Bishop Charles started an orphanage and entrusted that to the Clarist sisters. He started four religious communities for Carmelite Sisters. They were at Mutholay, Changanacherry, Vaikom, and Arakkuzha. He also promoted the establishment of the Visitation Congregation for the Southists at Kaipuzha.

Succession Plan 

In 1892 Bishop Charles got sick. He had a surgery done in St. Martha's Hospital Bangalore by a French doctor. He did not fully recover from the sickness. He and the Vicar Apostolic of Trichur Msgr. Adolphus Edwin Medlycott recommended to Propaganda Fide, the reconstitution of the Kottayam and Trichur vicariates as Vicariates of Trichur, Ernakulam, and Changanacherry.

The prefect of Propaganda Fide in Rome Mieczysław Halka-Ledóchowski asked Bishop Charles in 1895 to recommend the names of priests who could be his successors of the Vicariate of Kottayam. He recommended Vicar General Mar Mathew Makil and his secretary Fr. Louis Pazhiparambil as the eligible candidates in his reply to the prefect dated 22 February 1895.

Since Bishop Charles' health was worsening, he went to Europe  with his secretary Fr. Luis Pazheparambil on 30 September 1895. His intention was to seek better medical treatment, visit the Pope to present the report of his vicariate, and to raise funds for the upgrading of St. Berchmans School in Changanacherry.  In January 1896, he had another surgery at his native Toulouse, and recovered from his sickness after this surgery.

According to the recommendation of the Apostolic Vicars of Kottayam and Trichur, the Holy See reconstituted the two vicariates as three with local priests as bishops. Thus, Mar Mathew Makil was appointed for Changanacherry, Mar Aloysius Pazheparambil for Ernakulam, and Mar John Menachery for Trichur on 28 July 1896.

Bishop of Trincomalee

Transition to Sri Lanka 
After his apostolic visit, he stayed at Uclés school in Spain and later at Balardi College in France. While in Europe, Bishop Charles came to know that he was relieved from his position of Vicar Apostolic of Kottayam. So he did not return to Kerala to accept any gratitude from the people he served for eight years.

During his stay in France, he was appointed as the Coadjutor Vicar Apostolic of Madagascar, France with effect from 8 May 1897. Bishop Jean-Baptiste Cazet, S.J. was the Vicar Apostolic of Madagascar at that time. The French government did not agree with Charles' appointment. So, he helped the local bishops in their pastoral ministry. Soon, Bishop Charles was appointed as the first bishop of the newly established Diocese of Trincomalee in Sri Lanka on 27 August 1898. He reached the new diocese in November 1898 and took charge.

Contributions in Trincomalee 
Bishop Charles converted many to Catholic faith. He opened a public library at Batticaloa in 1907 to keep communication with the non-Christians. He constructed many churches and reconstructed the old ones.

The bishop promoted  education of children. He started orphanages and schools. He established a collage in Trincomalee with the support of missionaries. To overcome the shortage of teachers, bishop started a  teachers' training school. He started orphanages and schools for girls and entrusted their management to religious congregations.

Bishop Charles promoted vocations to priesthood and religious life. He established a minor seminary in his diocese. Candidates to priesthood were sent to different seminaries for formation. He welcomed missionaries from Europe including nuns and religious brothers. He promoted establishing religious congregations in his diocese. The bishop trained foreign missionaries in Tamil language for preaching to the local people. He established retreat centers in his diocese.

Silver Jubilee 
Trincomalee Diocese celebrated the Episcopal Silver Jubilee of Bishop Charles Lavinge on 13 November 1912. Besides the large attendance in the jubilee celebration, greetings and gifts came to the jubilarian from different countries and people of different religions including Kerala where he served before. Pope Pius X honored him with the title, "Domestic Prelate and Assistant to the Pontifical Throne."

End Times 
Bishop Charles went to Europe in 1913. He visited Marseille in France and then went to the Vatican to visit the Pope. He visited France, Belgium, and Holland. He took rest at his native place, Marvejols in France. While taking part in a reception in his honor at Montpellier Charity School, he became ill and contracted pneumonia. His sickness got verse. He received Sacrament of the Sick from the Superior of the Society of Jesus. He died on 11 July 1913 at the age of 73, and buried in the cathedral there.

The Archeparchy of Kottayam has installed a monument at his first Cathedral St. George's Church Edacat in Kottayam where he was installed as the Vicar Apostolic of Kottayam on 10 May 1888. The Visitation Congregation's convent in Edacat and the Vallambrosian Benedictine Minor Seminary near Kottayam are established in the name of Bishop Charles Lavinge.

Timeline 

 1840 January 6: Birth at Marvejols in France.
 1864 December 17: Priestly Ordination
 1864 - 1866: Professor at Diocesan Minor Seminary
 1866 December 27: Religious Profession in the Society of Jesus
 1866 - 1871: Trainer and professor in the Minor Seminary
 1871 - 1880: Taught Mathematics and Physics at Kausia College
 1880: Professor of Science at Uclés College in Spain.
 1887 August 23: Appointment as Vicar Apostolic of Kottayam.
 1887 November 13: Episcopal Ordination
 1888 March 15: Bishop Charles started his journey to Kerala.
 1888 April 5: Bishop Charles reached Trichy.
 1888 May 1: Reception at Ernakulam
 1888 May 9: Reception at Mannanam
 1888 May 10: Bishop Charles Lavigne took charge by reading the bull at Edacat church, Kottayam.
 1888 December 14: Establishment of Franciscan Clarist Congregation (FCC) at Changanacherry.
 1888 December 18–20: Changanacherry Synod to coordinate pastoral arrangements of the vicariate.
 1889 September 8: Appointment of Fr. Mani Nidhiriakkal and Fr. Mathew Makil as Vicar Generals with special privileges.
 1890 September 16: Seat of Kottayam Vicariate was moved to Changanacherry.
 1891 October (Thulam) 10: Organized parishes under eight foranes and two foranes for the Southists.
 1892 June 24: Foundation of Sisters of the Visitation of the Blessed Virgin Mary (SVM) at Kaipuzha, Kottayam.
 1895 February 22: Bishop Charles recommended to Rome Fr. Mathew Makil and Fr. Louis Pazheparambil as eligible successors for him.
 1895 September 30: Bishop Charles went to Europe with his secretary Fr. Luis Pazheparambil.
 1896 July 28: The term of Bishop Charles ended when Pope Leo XIII reconstituted the Syrian Vicariates as Changanacherry, Trichur, and Ernakulam with Malayalee bishops.
 1897 May 8: Appointed as Coadjutor Vicar Apostolic of Madagascar, France
 1898 August 27: Appointment as the first Bishop of Trincomalee, Sri Lanka
 1907 Started a public library at Batticalo in Sri Lanka. 
 1912 November 13: Episcopal Silver Jubilee celebration at Trincomalee. 
 1913: Visit to Vatican and Europe 
 1913 July 11: Death at Marvejols in France.

See also 

 Knanayology
 Archeparchy of Kottayam
 Archeparchy of Changanacherry
 Diocese of Trincomalee

Bibliography 
 Choolaparambil, Mar Alexander (Ed)., Pastoral Letters, കാലം ചെയ്ത ഡോക്ടർ ലവീഞ്ഞ്, ഡോക്ടർ മാക്കീൽ എന്നീ വന്ദ്യ പിതാക്കന്മാർ തങ്ങളുടെ ഭരണകാലത്തു പ്രസിദ്ധപ്പെടുത്തിയിട്ടുള്ളത്. Kottayam: The Catholic Diocese of Kottayam. 1925.
 Koottummel, Joseph (1998). "മാർ ചാറൽസ് ലവീഞ്ഞ്," ചങ്ങനാശേരി അതിരൂപത ഇന്നലെ, ഇന്ന്. Changanacherry: Archeparchy of Changanacherry. pp. 122–159.
 Kottoor, Dr. Thomas (2012). "ബിഷപ്പ് കാർലോസ് ലവീഞ്ഞ് കോട്ടയം അതിരൂപതയ്ക്ക് വഴികാട്ടി" കോട്ടയം അതിരൂപത ശതാബ്ദി സ്മരണിക 1911- 2011. Kottayam: Archeparchy of Kottayam. 2012, pp. 22–23.
 Makil, Mathew (2001). കോട്ടയം മിസത്തിന്റെ സ്ഥാപന ചരിത്രം. Kottayam: Bishop Makil Foundation.
 Moolakkatt, Archbishop Mathew (2006), "കോട്ടയം അതിരൂപത: ഉത്ഭവവും വളർച്ചയും" സുവർണ്ണസ്മൃതി, Golden Jubilee Souvenir, Changanacherry: Archeparchy of Changanacherry, pp. 389–392.
 Mutholath, Fr. Abraham (Ed.) Dr. Charles Lavigne S.J. (1986). The Diocese of Kottayam Platinum Souvenir 1911-1986. Kottayam: Jyothi Book House. pp. 79–81.
 Pallath, Paul & George Kanjirakkatt. Origin of the Southist Vicariate of Kottayam, Acts and Facts. Vadavathoor, Kottayam: Oriental Institute of Religious Studies India. .
 Perumthottam, Dr. Joseph (Ed.) (1999). മാർ ചാൾസ് ലവീഞ്ഞ്, ജീവചരിത്രവും ഇടയലേഖനങ്ങളും. Changanacherry: HIRS Publications.
 ശാന്തിതീർത്ഥം, വിസിറ്റേഷൻ സഭാചരിത്രം (History of the Visitation Sisters). Kottayam: Visitation Congregation, Kottayam. 1997. pp. 92–95.

External links
 Knanayology
 Expired Bishops of the Archdiocese of Kottayam
 Diocese of Trincomalee
 Biodata from Catholic Hierarchy website

References

1840 births
1913 deaths
19th-century Eastern Catholic bishops
20th-century Eastern Catholic bishops
French Jesuits
Archbishops of Changanassery
Christian clergy from Kottayam
French Roman Catholic bishops in Asia